The Journal of Education Policy is a bimonthly peer-reviewed academic journal covering education policy. It was established in 1986 and is published by Taylor & Francis. The editors-in-chief are founding editor Ivor Goodson (University of Brighton) and Stephen Ball (UCL Institute of Education). According to the Journal Citation Reports, the journal has a 2016 impact factor of 2.313, ranking it 24th out of 235 journals in the category "Education & Educational Research".

References

External links

Education journals
Policy analysis journals
Taylor & Francis academic journals
Publications established in 1986
Bimonthly journals
English-language journals
Education policy journals